Arthur William Aleshire (February 15, 1900 – March 11, 1940) was an American  politician serving as a U.S. Representative from Ohio for one term from 1937 to 1939.

Early life and career
Born near Luray, Virginia, Aleshire attended the rural schools. He moved to Clark County, Ohio, in 1912 with his parents, who settled on a farm near Springfield. He was employed by a railway express company in 1921 and 1922. 

He engaged in dairy farming near Springfield, Ohio, in 1922 and 1923. He married Myrtle Marsh in 1922, and they had one son, Melvin.

Accident
Due to an accident in 1923, he lost the use of his legs and operated a filling station and grocery store in a wheelchair until his election to Congress.

Congress
Aleshire was elected as a Democrat to the Seventy-fifth Congress (January 3, 1937 – January 3, 1939). He was an unsuccessful candidate for reelection in 1938 to the Seventy-sixth Congress. He resumed his former business pursuits near Springfield, Ohio.

Death
He died in Springfield, Ohio, March 11, 1940.  He was interred in Ferncliff Cemetery.

Sources

1900 births
1940 deaths
Politicians from Springfield, Ohio
People from Luray, Virginia
Democratic Party members of the United States House of Representatives from Ohio
Politicians with paraplegia
American politicians with disabilities
20th-century American politicians